Liston Stadium is a sport stadium in Baldwin City, Kansas, United States.  The facility is primarily used by Baker University for college football, track and field, and soccer.  It is also host to other university and city athletic and non-athletic events.  The facility is also used for local high school football games.

The stadium was named for former Baker football coach and athletic director Emil Liston.

References

External links
 Baker Athletics Facilities official website

College football venues
Baker Wildcats football
American football venues in Kansas
Buildings and structures in Douglas County, Kansas